Cleonice, Princess of Bithynia is a 1775 tragedy by the British writer John Hoole. It is set in Bithynia during the Ancient era.

The original Covent Garden cast included Spranger Barry as Artabuses, Robert Bensley as Lycomedes, William Thomas Lewis as Pharnaces, John Lee as Orontes, Thomas Hull as Teramenes, John Whitfield as Agenor and Elizabeth Hartley as Cleonice.

References

Bibliography
 Nicoll, Allardyce. A History of English Drama 1660–1900: Volume III. Cambridge University Press, 2009.
 Hogan, C.B (ed.) The London Stage, 1660–1800: Volume V. Southern Illinois University Press, 1968.

1775 plays
British plays
Tragedy plays
West End plays